Wilfrid Mylchreest Simmonds,  (19 December 1889 – 2 January 1967) was an Australian butcher, auctioneer, sugar farmer and politician, briefly a Senator for Queensland.

Born in Cairns, Queensland, he was educated at Mulgrave before becoming a sugar cane grower. After serving in the military 1917–1919, he sat on Mulgrave Shire Council. He was an unsuccessful Country Party candidate for the division of Kennedy at the 1940 and 1943 elections. His term began on 22 February 1950 and was not due to end until 30 June 1952, however a double dissolution was called and his term ended on 19 March 1951. As the most junior senator he was dropped from the coalition senate ticket. Simmonds was appointed a Member of the British Empire (MBE) in 1961.

He died in Babinda in 1967, aged 77.

References

1889 births
1967 deaths
National Party of Australia members of the Parliament of Australia
Members of the Australian Senate for Queensland
Members of the Australian Senate
Australian Members of the Order of the British Empire
20th-century Australian politicians